WKUN (1490 AM) is a radio station broadcasting a Good Time Oldies format. It is licensed to Monroe, Georgia, United States. The station is currently owned by B.R. Anderson and features programming from Salem Communications.

References

External links

KUN